Alessandra Rose Biaggi (born May 20, 1986) is an American politician who served as a member of the New York State Senate from 2019 to 2022, representing the 34th district, which includes portions of Bronx and Westchester Counties. She was the chair of the New York State Senate Committee on Ethics and Internal Governance. She is the granddaughter of former U.S. Congressman Mario Biaggi.

In February 2022, Biaggi announced her candidacy for New York's 3rd congressional district after the incumbent representative Thomas Suozzi announced his run for New York Governor. After court ordered redistricting removed Westchester County and the Bronx from the 3rd congressional district, Biaggi announced her candidacy for New York's 17th congressional district, where she unsuccessfully ran against Sean Patrick Maloney, who decided to run in the 17th congressional district currently represented by Mondaire Jones, into which his home was drawn, rather than the 18th district he then represented.

Early life and education 
Biaggi was born in Mount Vernon, New York, and is Italian-American. Her great-grandparents had immigrated to the United States from Italy, and she is the fourth generation of her family to live in her district. She grew up first in Fort Lee, New Jersey, and when she was eight years old she moved with her family to Pelham, New York. When she was a child, she was sexually abused for over a year.

She graduated from Pelham Memorial High School ('04), where Biaggi was a cheerleader. After attending Loyola College, Biaggi transferred to and ultimately graduated from New York University with a Bachelor of Arts degree in 2008.

She then first attended St. John's University School of Law. She subsequently transferred to and graduated from Fordham Law School in 2012, where she was a member of the Fordham Law Review. She was the first woman from her family to graduate from law school. In 2014, she attended the Women's Campaign School at Yale University.

Career

Early years 
Biaggi interned in the office of U.S. Congressman Joseph Crowley after college, and while in law school with the Brooklyn District Attorney Rackets Bureau and the U.S. Attorney's Office for the Southern District of New York Public Corruption and Appellate Bureaus. She then worked from 2014 to 2015 at her first job as a lawyer, as Assistant General Counsel for New York State Governor Andrew Cuomo’s Office of Storm Recovery.

From May 2015 to December 2016, during the campaign for the 2016 U.S. presidential election, Biaggi served as Deputy National Operations Director for the Hillary Clinton 2016 presidential campaign. She oversaw a staff of 200, and a budget of $500 million. She said: "Everything was urgent in the moment. It was total chaos and I loved it. We played very hard, and it was very hard to lose."

Following the election, she worked on various advocacy and voter engagement measures. In April to December 2017, Biaggi served as counsel in Governor Cuomo's Counsel's Office, and as a member of the governor's executive clemency team. She also created the Take Action Guide for Activism.

New York State Senate (2019–2022) 
Biaggi has served since 2019 as chair of the Senate Committee on Ethics and Internal Governance.

Combating sexual abuse is one of Biaggi's policy issues. She has led the first public hearings in the New York State Senate on workplace sexual harassment in 27 years, and fought for tougher sexual harassment laws. Susan Kang, Associate Professor of political science at John Jay College of Criminal Justice, said: "She is definitely making a name for herself as someone who is an advocate for victims of sexual violence."

Biaggi is also focused on institutional reform of Congress, of the Supreme Court, and institutions. Specifically, Biaggi is also focused on banning trading stocks among members.

Campaign

Biaggi ran in 2018 in the primary for the Democratic nomination for New York State Senate in District 34. While only 32 years old, she ran against powerful longtime incumbent Jeffrey D. Klein, the number 2 Democrat in the NY Senate and the leader of the Independent Democratic Conference, who had held the seat for 14 years. Klein outspent Biaggi by a rate of 9-to-1, spending $2.7 million to her $333,000. Biaggi said: "The more people told me I couldn’t win, the more obsessed I became."

In a major upset, Biaggi defeated Klein in the primary, 54%–46%. She remarked: "It was a tough fight. And, I should also say, we should thank [Senator Klein] for his service. But his time is up."

Subsequently, on November 6, 2018, she defeated Republican Richard Ribustello 76.0%–14.9%, and was elected to the New York State Senate. At 32 years of age, she became one of the youngest women ever elected to the New York State Senate.

Tenure 
In June 2019, the New York legislature passed sweeping anti-sexual-harassment legislation that Biaggi had sponsored. Among other things, the bills reduced employers' ability to avoid liability for their employees' behavior, provided for attorney fees and punitive damages, and lengthened the time frame within which to file complaints. In her first six months in office, Biaggi introduced 80 bills, 17 of which were passed.

In 2020, Biaggi won the Democratic primary with 88% of the vote. She then won the general election with 74% of the vote.

In February 2021, Biaggi wrote on Twitter: "@NYGovCuomo, you are a monster, and it is time for you to go. Now." At the time, her call for his resignation was what The New York Times described as: "something of an outlier in the Democrat-controlled Legislature." On August 10, 2021, Governor Andrew Cuomo announced his resignation.

In May 2021 journalist Matthew Kassel opined: "Biaggi ... has gained a reputation, on her own merits, as an upstate force — an influential lawmaker with a growing list of legislative accomplishments who has carved out a space for herself as an outspoken and independent voice in Albany’s cutthroat political sphere."

On September 24, 2021, Biaggi co-wrote a letter to US Senator Maria Cantwell with eight other New York State Senators, requesting that the US Senate Committee on Commerce, Science, and Transportation engage in oversight of the United States Center for SafeSport, and step in to ensure that SafeSport is adequately conducting investigations. They referred to what they called SafeSport's failure to carry out impartial and thorough investigations, and ensure the safety of athletes it is charged with protecting. They highlighted the fact that despite serious outstanding allegations of sexual misconduct, sexual coercion, and other violent behaviors by former friends, peers, and current teammates, and an ongoing investigation, fencer Alen Hadzic was allowed to travel to Tokyo as an alternate for the 2021 US Olympic fencing team.

Biaggi has been a vocal advocate for defunding the police.

She has received a rating of 100% from Planned Parenthood Empire State (2019 and 2020), from New York League of Conservation Voters (2019), and from EPL/Environmental Advocates (2019 and 2020).

In 2022, Biaggi received criticism over her treatment of her staff.

2022 congressional campaign 
On June 7, 2022, Biaggi announced that she would be run for New York's 17th congressional district in a primary challenge against DCCC chair Sean Patrick Maloney. Upon her announcement, she was endorsed by Alexandria Ocasio-Cortez. On August 23, 2022, Biaggi lost to Maloney in the primary election by a wide margin.

Recognition 
In 2019, Crain's New York Business named her to its annual "40 Under 40" list.

In June 2021, she was named to the Hunter College New York City Food Policy Center annual 40 Under 40: The Rising Stars in NYC Food Policy. She was noted for working "to transform and improve the food system." In November 2021, Biaggi was named to the City & State New York "Women 100", as one of the prominent women wielding power in New York State. She was noted especially for having long pushed for legislation addressing sexual assault and sexual abuse.

Personal life 
Biaggi's grandfather Mario Biaggi served as a Democratic member of the U.S. House of Representatives from New York from 1969 to 1988.

On July 22, 2019, in Tarrytown, New York, Biaggi married Nathaniel Koloc. He is a management consultant whom she met in 2015 and who also worked on the Hillary Clinton 2016 presidential campaign.

References

External links

New York State Senate Alessandra Biaggi official site

1986 births
21st-century American politicians
American people of Italian descent
Candidates in the 2022 United States House of Representatives elections
Child sexual abuse in the United States
Fordham University School of Law alumni
Hillary Clinton 2016 presidential campaign
Democratic Party members of the New York State Assembly
New York (state) lawyers
Democratic Party New York (state) state senators
Lawyers from New York City
Legislators from Westchester County, New York
Living people
People from Fort Lee, New Jersey
People from Pelham, New York
Politicians from Mount Vernon, New York
Politicians from the Bronx
Steinhardt School of Culture, Education, and Human Development alumni